A. Jaya is an Indian politician and incumbent Mayor of Tiruchirappalli Municipal Corporation. She represents All India Anna Dravida Munnetra Kazhagam party.

References 

All India Anna Dravida Munnetra Kazhagam politicians
Living people
Mayors of places in Tamil Nadu
Politicians from Tiruchirappalli
Tamil Nadu municipal councillors
Women mayors of places in Tamil Nadu
21st-century Indian women politicians
21st-century Indian politicians
Year of birth missing (living people)